12935/12936 Bandra Terminus - Surat Intercity Express is an Express train belonging to Indian Railways that runs between Bandra Terminus and Surat of India. A daily service, it operates as train number 12935 from Bandra Terminus to Surat and as train number 12936 in the reverse direction.

Coaches

12935/36 Bandra Terminus - Surat Intercity Express has 3 AC chair car(CC), 1 First Class(FC), 6 2nd Class Seating(2S), 9 General Unreserved(GEN) and 2 Seating cum Luggage Rake(SLR) coaches.

As with most train services in India, Coach composition may be amended at the discretion of Indian Railways depending on demand.

Service and Halts

12935/36 Bandra Terminus - Surat Intercity Express initially ran as 19035/36 which was later converted to the present train no. 12935/36.

It is a daily service covering the distance of 252 km in 4 hours 20 mins in both directions giving an average speed of 58 km/hr.

The important halts of the train are:

 Bandra Terminus
 Andheri
 Borivali
 Virar
 Boisar
 Vapi
 Valsad
 Bilimora Junction
 Navsari
 Surat

Traction

Dual traction WCAM-1 locomotive hauls the train all the way between Bandra Terminus & Surat. After Western Railway switched over to AC system in February 2012, it is hauled by a WAP-4E or WAP-5 or WAP-7 locomotive from the Vadodara shed.

Rake Sharing

No Rake Sharing.

References 

Transport in Mumbai
Transport in Surat
Rail transport in Gujarat
Intercity Express (Indian Railways) trains
Rail transport in Maharashtra